Class Action is a 1991 American legal drama film directed by Michael Apted. Gene Hackman and Mary Elizabeth Mastrantonio star; Larry Fishburne, Colin Friels, Fred Dalton Thompson, and Donald Moffat are also featured. The film was entered into the 17th Moscow International Film Festival.

Plot
The story is about a lawsuit concerning injuries caused by a defective automobile. The suit takes on a personal dimension because the injured plaintiff's attorney, Jedediah Tucker Ward, discovers that the automobile manufacturer's attorney is his estranged daughter, Maggie Ward.

Jedediah Ward is a liberal civil rights lawyer who has based his career on helping people avoid being taken for a ride by the rich and powerful; he's pursued principle at the expense of profit, though he has a bad habit of not following up on his clients after their cases are settled.

Jed's daughter, Maggie, has had a bad relationship with her father ever since she discovered that he was cheating on her mother, Estelle, and while she also has made a career in law, she has taken a very different professional route by working for a high-powered corporate law firm and has adopted a self-interested political agenda.

Jed is hired to help field a lawsuit against ARGO, a major auto manufacturer, whose Meridian station wagons have a dangerous propensity to explode on impact when the left turn signal light is activated. While his research indicates that he has an all but airtight case against them, the case becomes more complicated for him when he discovers that Maggie is representing the firm he's suing.

The auto manufacturer in the film also utilizes a "bean-counting" approach to risk management, whereby the projections of actuaries for probable deaths and injured car-owners is weighed against the cost of re-tooling and re-manufacturing (i.e. recalling) the car without the defect (exploding gas tanks) with the resulting decision to keep the car as is to positively benefit short-term profitability.

Cast

Production notes
The central premise of the film is roughly analogous to the controversy surrounding the Ford Pinto and its fuel tank design. A 1977 article in Mother Jones alleged Ford was aware of the design flaw, refused to pay for a redesign, and decided it would be cheaper to pay off possible lawsuits. The magazine obtained a cost-benefit analysis that it said Ford had used to compare the cost of repairs (Ford estimated the cost to be $11 per car) against the cost of settlements for deaths, injuries, and vehicle burnouts.  The memo in question was actually prepared by Ford in response to a NHTSA request for comment, it reviewed not Ford but the entire new car market and was not used to make product decisions at Ford. The document became known as the Ford Pinto Memo.

Locations
Scenes of the film were shot in the restaurant of the Beach Chalet in Ocean Beach, San Francisco and show historic 1930s murals of San Francisco life by Lucien Labaudt.

Reception
Class Action opened at #4 in its opening weekend with $4,207,923 and ended with a domestic gross of $24,277,858; a worldwide total of $28,277,918 was made and the film was a moderate box office success.

The film received generally positive reviews. It holds a 77% rating on Rotten Tomatoes from 26 critics. On Metacritic, it has a score of 58 out of 100 based on reviews from 18 critics, indicating "mixed or average reviews".

See also
 Grimshaw v. Ford Motor Co.

References

External links
 
 
 
 
 
 
 
 Interview with Producer Robert Cort and writers Carolyn Shelby and Christopher Ames on the film's 20th anniversary at Abnormal Use

1991 films
1990s legal films
1990s thriller drama films
American legal drama films
American thriller drama films
Class action lawsuits
American courtroom films
1990s English-language films
Films about lawsuits
Films directed by Michael Apted
Films scored by James Horner
Films set in San Francisco
Interscope Communications films
20th Century Fox films
1991 drama films
Films produced by Scott Kroopf
Films about father–daughter relationships
1990s American films